Ilham Naghiyev ; born on January 1, 1988, in Baku, Azerbaijan) is an Azerbaijani economist,  author, IT entrepreneur, the President of the Baku United FC association football club and the founder of Odlar Yurdu Organization.

Early life and education 
Ilham Naghiyev was born on January 1, 1988, in Baku, Azerbaijan Soviet Socialist Republic (now the Republic of Azerbaijan).

Having completed his education at a lyceum between 1994 till 2004, Ilham Naghiyev was admitted part-time to Business Administration and Management faculty  of the Azerbaijan State University of Economics in 2004. He pursued his education at the SOAS University of London from 2005 to 2006. Naghiyev studied full-time at Business Management faculty of City, University of London (CASS Business School) between 2006 and 2009.  Ilham Naghiyev received his master's degree (MBA) from Azerbaijan State University of Economics in the following three years. Currently, he is following education in TRIUM (HEC Paris, London School of Economics, New York University Stern School of Business joint program) Executive MBA.

Career 
Ilham Naghiyev kicked off his career as the CEO of GESCO OJSC in 2010 and had remained at this post by 2013. Simultaneously, he was a shareholder of the company from 2010. Ilham Naghiyev was the Chairman of the supervisory board of GESCO OJSC from 2019 to 2022.

From 2013 till 2016, Ilham Naghiyev served as Deputy Head and then Head of the Human Resources Department of the Ministry of Education of the Republic of Azerbaijan. In 2016, Ilham Naghiyev was appointed as vice president on Strategic Development at Bina Agro CJSC. He was the head (CEO) and the head of the supervisory board of Bina Agro CJSC between 2017- 2019 and 2019- 2021, respectively.

Ilham Naghiyev has so far led the "Odlar Yurdu" Organization (OYO) since 2018. In 2020, Ilham Naghiyev founded the Odlar Yurdu Research Center.

The football club called Baku United FC, that managed to join England’s National Futsal League as a professional team, was created by Ilham Naghiyev in 2008.

Personal life 
Ilham Naghiyev is married and has two daughters and a son.

References 

1988 births
Living people
People from Baku